International Association of Democratic Lawyers (IADL) is an international organization of left-wing and progressive jurists' associations with sections and members in 50 countries and territories. Along with facilitating contact and exchange of views between and among lawyers and lawyers' associations of all countries, the IADL works to conduct research on legal issues affecting human, political and economic rights, organizes international commissions of enquiry and conferences on legal and judicial concerns, and takes part in international legal observer missions. Through its activities the Association works as a recognized consultative organization with the United Nations through ECOSOC, UNESCO and UNICEF.

History
The Association was founded in Paris in 1946. The IADL soon became Communist-controlled and the United States became especially aggravated at IADL claims that they had documented proof of the US dropping poisoned mosquitos on North Koreans and mass-torturing civilians during the Korean War. René Cassin resigned his presidency of the organization as a result in 1951, and the US successfully lobbied France to expel the headquarters of what it considered a communist front from Paris. As a response, the Central Intelligence Agency started funding the International Commission of Jurists. Still in 1990 for example, the Soviet Union funded the organization with 100,000 US dollars.

From 1967 the IADL was one of the original NGOs accredited with Consultative II Status with ECOSOC and is represented at UNESCO and UNICEF. The Association is also a member of the Conference of NGOs (CONGO) of the United Nations.

Headquarters

International Headquarters – Rue Brialmont 21, B-1210, Brussels, Belgium

International Secretariat – Ito Bldg 2nd Floor, Yotsuya 1–2, Shinjuku-ku, 160–0004, Tokyo, Japan

Organization
The IADL is organized on the basis of institutional member organizations, regional and affiliated sections, groups and individual membership, representing about 200,000 members in all.

Institutional Members:
 Bangladesh – Democratic Lawyers Association of Bangladesh (DLAB)
 Belgium – Progress Lawyers Network As of 2010 it has offices in Antwerp and Brussels.
 Bulgaria – Union of Jurists in Bulgaria
 Cuba – Unión Nacional de Juristas de Cuba
 Finland – Suomen Demokraattiset Lakimiehet
 France – Droit Solidarité
 Germany (West) – Vereinigung Demokratischer Juristen Deutschlands
 Italy – Giuristi Democratici
 India – All India Lawyers Union
 India – Indian Association of Lawyers
 Japan – Japanese Lawyers International Solidarity Association (JALISA)
 Morocco – Association Marocaine des Droits Humains
 North Korea – Korean Democratic Lawyers Organisation
 Philippines – The National Union of Peoples’ Lawyers (NUPL)
 United Kingdom – Haldane Society of Socialist Lawyers
 United States – National Lawyers Guild

Regional and Affiliated Members:
 Arab Lawyers Union
 American Association of Jurists
 Palestinian Centre for Human Rights
 European Association of Lawyers for Democracy and World Human Rights
 European Lawyers for Democracy and Human Rights
 European Democratic Lawyers. Its member organizations are:
 Belgium – Le Syndicat des Avocats pour la Démocratie (S.A D.)
 France – Le Syndicat des Avocats de France (S.A.F.)
 Germany – Der Republikanische Anwältinnen und Anwälteverein (RAV)
 Italy – La Confederazione Nazionale Delle Associazioni Sindicali Forensi d 'Italia
 Italy – L'Iniziativa Democratica Forense (I.D.F.)
 Italy – Legal Team Italia ( L.T.I.)
 Netherlands – De Vereniging Sociale Advokatuur Nederland (VSAN)
 Spain – L 'Associació Catalana per a la Defensa dels Drets Humans (A.C.D.D.H)
 Spain – La Asociación Libre de Abogados (ALA)
 Spain – Euskal Herriko Abokatuen Elkartea (ESKUBIDEAK)

Activities
 IADL sent a team to investigate allegations of biological warfare in the Korean War in 1951, and published "Report on U.S. Crimes in Korea", alleging the United States has used biological weapons during Korean War.
 In 2006, IADL claimed that the United Nations Stabilisation Mission in Haiti was manipulated by the United States, and called for the release of members of leftist party Fanmi Lavalas.
 IADL filed an amicus curiae with the US Supreme Court in 2009 to free five Cuban intelligence officers who were convicted in Miami of conspiracy to commit espionage and murder.
 IADL opposed the use of military force against Syria and Iran in 2012.

Economic and Social Council consultative status
IADL applied for Category B consultative status with the UN Economic and Social Council in 1954, 1955, 1957 and 1959, but the application was rejected. The application was accepted in 1967.

At the end of 1967, there were 377 non-governmental
organizations (NGOs) which the United Nations Economic and Social Council could consult on questions with which they are concerned.

The organizations are divided into three groups: those in Category A, which have a basic interest in most of the activities of the council; those in Category B, which have a special competence
but are concerned with only a few of the council's activities; and those with a significant contribution to make to the council's work, which are placed on a Register for ad hoc consultations. At the end of 1967, there were 143 NGOs with Category B status.

See also
International Organization of Journalists
International Union of Students
Women's International Democratic Federation
World Federation of Trade Unions
World Federation of Democratic Youth
World Federation of Scientific Workers
World Peace Council

References

External links
 Official website

International political organizations
International law organizations
Communist front organizations
Organizations established in 1946
International organisations based in Belgium